Supreeth Reddy is an Indian actor who primarily acts in Telugu-language films. He is known for his roles in films like Chatrapati and Maryada Ramanna. He played villain, and supporting roles.

He also acted in Bollywood in the film Rowdy Rathore, a remake of the Telugu film Vikramarkudu. He also played one of the baddies in Aamir Khan's Ghajini.

Career
He was interested in films from his childhood. He was also a volleyball player in his childhood. He missed the auditions for the film Jayam. Later he was advised by director Teja to maintain an album. He acted in Pawan Kalyan's directorial debut Johnny. For the sports film Sye, directed by S. S. Rajamouli, he was trained in Rugby.

He was first selected as a friend of the Hero Prabhas in Chhatrapati, but his role was changed to Kaatraj, a villain, later. This got him a lot of name and fame. After that he played villain roles in many films.

Though he got opportunities as a hero, he did not accept them. Personally he likes the acting style of Mohan Babu and Kota Srinivasa Rao.

Personal life
Supreeth is married to Priyanka and they have two sons.

Filmography

References

External links 
 

Living people
Telugu male actors
Male actors in Telugu cinema
Indian male film actors
Male actors from Hyderabad, India
21st-century Indian male actors
Year of birth missing (living people)